Big Brother 2007 may refer to:

Big Brother 8 (UK)
Big Brother 8 (U.S.)
Big Brother Australia 2007
Big Brother 2007 (Finland)
Big Brother (Slovenia)
 Big Brother Brasil 7, the seventh season of Big Brother Brazil
 Big Brother Germany 7, the seventh season of Big Brother Germany
 Celebrity Big Brother 5 (UK)
Bigg Boss (Indian TV series)
 Grande Fratello 7, the seventh season of Grande Fratello
Pinoy Big Brother (season 2)
Pinoy Big Brother: Celebrity Edition 2
VIP Brother 2 (Bulgaria)
 Veliki brat 2, the second season of Veliki brat